Tamazula   is one of the 39 municipalities of Durango, in north-western Mexico. The municipal seat lies at Tamazula de Victoria. The municipality covers an area of 5188.1 km².

As of 2010, the municipality had a total population of 26,368.

The municipality had 865 localities, the largest of which (with 2010 populations in parentheses) were: Tamazula de Victoria (2,337), classified as urban, and El Durazno (1,044), classified as rural.

References

Municipalities of Durango